Weinreb is a surname. It may refer to:

Persons
 Joseph Weinreb (1869–1943), first chief rabbi of Toronto, Canada.
 Daniel Weinreb (1959–2012), American programmer
 Friedrich Weinreb (1910–1988), Jewish theologian
 Lloyd Weinreb (born 1936), Harvard Law School Professor
 Steven M. Weinreb (born 1941), Penn State University Chemistry Professor
 Tzvi Hersh Weinreb (born 1940), Rabbi and Executive Vice President of the Orthodox Union

See also
 Weinreb ketone synthesis
 Weinrib (disambiguation)

German-language surnames
Jewish surnames